Three vessels named Frederick have served the British Royal Navy (RN). In each case, the service was brief.

 Between 1799 and 1801 the Royal Navy deployed a schooner named Frederick in the West Indies. She was under the command of a Lieutenant W. Edwards.
 In 1803 the hired armed cutter Lord Nelson was renamed Frederick for the last few months of her service.
 In 1819 the insurance companies in Malta hired a Gibraltarian brig named Frederick to chase a British pirate, Captain Delano, in William.  and  provided a lieutenant, a midshipman, and 18 seamen to man Frederick. After Frederick captured William, and the pirates, most of whom were later hanged, the RN personnel returned to their vessels.

See also
  - Castle-class trawler in service from May 1918 to her sale in 1922
  was an 86-gun screw-propelled first-rate ship of the line

Royal Navy ship names